Communication Heights are a group of highly eroded ice-free elevations to the south of Midnight Plateau in the Darwin Mountains. It was so named because features in the area are named for communication workers.

References
 

Mountains of Oates Land